The Uzbekistan men's national handball team is the national team of Uzbekistan. It is governed by the Handball Federation of Uzbekistan and takes part in international team handball competitions.

Records

Asian Championship

Asian Games

Results

References

External links
IHF profile

Uzbekistan
Hand